Ectoedemia maculata is a moth of the family Nepticulidae. It was described by Puplesis in 1987. It is known from the Russian Far East.

See also 
 List of moths of Russia

References

Nepticulidae
Moths of Asia
Moths described in 1987